Baghesht (also Romanized as Bāghesht) is a village in Bashtin Rural District, Bashtin District, Davarzan County, Razavi Khorasan Province, Iran. At the 2006 census, its population was 11, in 4 families.

See also 

 List of cities, towns and villages in Razavi Khorasan Province

References 

Populated places in Davarzan County